Garden County is a county in the U.S. state of Nebraska. As of the 2010 United States Census, the population was 2,057. Its county seat is Oshkosh.

In the Nebraska license plate system, Garden County is represented by the prefix 77 (it had the seventy-seventh-largest number of vehicles registered in the state when the license plate system was established in 1922).

History
Garden County was formed in 1909 by popular vote. Voters in the general election of November 2, 1909 approved making the northern part of Deuel County into its own county. It is said the county was so named in the hope that this land should become the garden of the West or with allusion to the "Garden of Eden".

The county has lost population since the Great Depression and Dust Bowl of the 1930s. The land was homesteaded for family farms that often turned out to be too small for subsistence farming under the arid conditions of the region. In the early decades of settlement by immigrants and migrants from the East, farmers did not know how to work the land on the prairies. Tons of topsoil were lost after droughts.

Geography
The North Platte River runs ESE through the south part of Garden County. Since the county is in the western portion of Nebraska, its residents observe Mountain Time. The eastern two-thirds portion of the state observes Central Time.

Major highways
  U.S. Highway 26
  Nebraska Highway 27
  Nebraska Highway 92

Adjacent counties

 Sheridan County - north
 Grant County - east
 Arthur County - east
 Keith County - southeast
 Deuel County - south
 Cheyenne County - southwest
 Morrill County - west

Protected areas
 Ash Hollow State Historical Park
 Clear Creek State Waterfowl Management Area (partial)
 Crescent Lake National Wildlife Refuge

Demographics

As of the 2000 United States Census, there were 2,292 people, 1,020 households, and 658 families in the county. The population density was 1.3 people per square mile (0.5/km2). There were 1,298 housing units at an average density of 0.8 per square mile (0.3/km2). The racial makeup of the county was 98.34% White, 0.13% Black or African American, 0.26% Native American, 0.26% Asian, 0.52% from other races, and 0.48% from two or more races. 1.44% of the population were Hispanic or Latino of any race. 43.5% were of German, 10.0% Irish, 9.6% American and 9.2% English ancestry.

There were 1,020 households, out of which 24.80% had children under the age of 18 living with them, 55.90% were married couples living together, 6.00% had a female householder with no husband present, and 35.40% were non-families. 32.50% of all households were made up of individuals, and 16.20% had someone living alone who was 65 years of age or older.  The average household size was 2.19 and the average family size was 2.77.

The county population contained 21.80% under the age of 18, 4.60% from 18 to 24, 22.70% from 25 to 44, 27.00% from 45 to 64, and 24.00% who were 65 years of age or older. The median age was 46 years. For every 100 females there were 94.90 males. For every 100 females age 18 and over, there were 91.40 males.

The median income for a household in the county was $26,458, and the median income for a family was $32,546. Males had a median income of $21,495 versus $17,000 for females. The per capita income for the county was $15,414. About 10.80% of families and 14.80% of the population were below the poverty line, including 22.00% of those under age 18 and 8.70% of those age 65 or over.

Politics
Like much of the Nebraska Panhandle, Garden County has been a Republican-leaning county since the late 20th century. It was one of only two counties that Ben Nelson failed to carry in 1994. In Presidential elections, the last Democratic candidate to carry the county was Franklin D. Roosevelt, in 1932. As part of Nebraska's 3rd congressional district, Garden County has been represented by Republicans since 1961.

Communities

City
 Oshkosh (county seat)

Village
 Lewellen

Census-designated place
 Lisco

Other unincorporated places
 Mumper
 Rackett

Former Communities
 Cormick
 Kowanda
 Lutherville
 Lytle
 Orlando
 Penn
 Ruthton
 Warren

See also

 National Register of Historic Places listings in Garden County, Nebraska

References

 
Nebraska counties
Populated places established in 1909
1909 establishments in Nebraska